The Accademia di Belle Arti di Macerata is an academy of fine arts located in Macerata, Italy. It was founded in 1972.

Initially, the Accademia was located in the Palazzo Buonaccorsi. After the Umbria and Marche earthquake of 1997, it was moved to its current location, in an 18th-century former convent. Among its directors were painters and art critics, including Remo Brindisi.

References

External links
  

 

Art schools in Italy
Education in Marche
Macerata
Educational institutions established in 1972
1972 establishments in Italy
Buildings and structures in Macerata